is a cape located in Sasebo, Nagasaki, Japan. It is the westernmost point of the island Kyūshū as well as the westernmost point of Japan's four main islands.

See also
 Extreme points of Japan

Headlands of Japan
Extreme points of Japan
Landforms of Nagasaki Prefecture
Sasebo